Calton is a village and civil parish in the Craven district of North Yorkshire, England, on the River Aire in Airedale. In both the 2001 and 2011 Censuses the population was less than 100, so details were included in the civil parish of Flasby with Winterburn. In 2015, North Yorkshire County Council estimated the population of the village to be 60.

The village is mentioned in the Domesday Book as belonging to Roger the Poitevin. The name derives from the Old English Calf-tūn; literally, the town where calves were reared. Ancient deeds and poll-tax returns indicate that the village had a public house and a chapel in 1379. In 1851 there were 75 residents listed in the census, of whom no fewer than 33, in five households, were called Shackleton.

Calton is on the Pennine Cycleway (NCN Route 68), and the Pennine Way passes the between the west of the village and the River Aire. This route is also part of the Airedale Way, between Leeds and Malham Tarn.

Notable people
John Lambert, Parliamentarian general in the English Civil War. Calton Hall, an old house with Medieval origins, was his family home. The house is now grade II listed. After the restoration of the monarchy, Lambert was tried and exiled to Guernsey, and the family home and land around Calton were given to Lord Fauconberg. He then returned them to the family.

References

External links

Village and area web site
Calton history pages

Villages in North Yorkshire
Civil parishes in North Yorkshire
Craven District